Sierra Norte de Sevilla is a Spanish geographical indication for Vino de la Tierra wines located in the Sierra Norte de Sevilla range of the Sierra Morena, Andalusia, southern Spain. Vino de la Tierra is one step below the mainstream Denominación de Origen indication on the Spanish wine quality ladder.

The area covered by this geographical indication comprises the municipalities of Cazalla de la Sierra, Constantina, Seville, Guadalcanal and Alanís, in the province of Seville. 

It acquired its Vino de la Tierra status in 2004.

Grape varieties
 White: Chardonnay, Pedro Ximénez, Palomino, Moscatel de Alejandría, Colombard and Sauvignon blanc
 Red: Garnacha tinta, Cabernet Sauvignon, Cabernet Franc, Merlot, Pinot noir, Petit Verdot and Syrah

References

Comarcas of Andalusia
Spanish wine
Wine regions of Spain
Wine-related lists
Appellations

ca:Sierra Norte
de:Sierra Norte
es:Sierra Norte de Sevilla
fr:Sierra nord de Séville
ru:Сьерра-Норте-де-Севилья